Omero James Mumba (born 2 July 1989) is an Irish actor, writer, and director.

Mumba was born in Dublin, Ireland, to Peter Mumba, a Zambian aircraft engineer and Barbara, who is Irish; his sister, Samantha Mumba, is an actress and singer. He features on the song "The Boy", released on her first album Gotta Tell You. In 2002, aged 13, he signed a recording contract with Polydor Records and released his own single "Lil' Big Man". It peaked at number 42 in the UK Singles Chart and number 16 in the Irish Singles Chart.

After appearing in a 1995 episode of the television series, The Governor, Mumba was cast opposite his sister, Samantha, in the 2002 film version of H.G. Wells' The Time Machine. He played Kalen, the brother of his sister's character. In 2009, he had a minor role in the Irish film 3 Crosses. 

In 2010, Mumba wrote and directed the music video 'Stay in the Middle' for Bruneian singer Hill Zaini, which was produced by Generator Entertainment and Sensible Music Group. The video includes a cameo appearance by Mariah Carey It was filmed in Notting Hill, London, shot on Super 16mm with anamorphic lenses. Ed Wild served as the cinematographer. The video was the recipient of a 2010 AVIMA (Asia Pacific Voice Independent Music Award) for "Most Mind-Blowing Music Video" where it came in third place.

Discography

Singles
 2002: "Lil' Big Man" #42 UK

References

External links

1989 births
21st-century Irish male singers
Irish male film actors
Living people
People from County Dublin
Irish people of Zambian descent
Black Irish people